Terrestrial Tones are Dave Portner (Avey Tare) of Animal Collective and Eric Copeland of Black Dice. The two were roommates who began recording together when both of their respective primary bands went on temporary hiatus in November 2004.

Discography

Albums
 Blasted (2005, Psych-o-path Records)
 Oboroed/Circus Lives (2005, UUAR)
 Dead Drunk (2006, Paw Tracks)

EPs and singles
 "Bro's" (2006, Panda Bear single, contributed remix)

References

American indie rock groups
American musical duos
Musical groups established in 2004
Musical groups disestablished in 2006